Sandy Cushon (born in Oxbow, Saskatchewan) is best known as former host of agricultural program Country Canada on CBC Television, which he hosted between 1975 and 2000.

He also hosted Points West for CBC Winnipeg.

References

Canadian television hosts
Canadian women television hosts
Living people
Year of birth missing (living people)